The 1932 New York City special mayoral election was held on November 8. It was triggered by the resignation of incumbent Democratic Mayor Jimmy Walker on September 1, after his administration had become embroiled in scandal. Democratic nominee John P. O'Brien easily defeated Republican Lewis H. Pounds and Socialist Morris Hillquit. Acting Mayor Joseph V. McKee also featured as a write-in candidate. Minor candidates included Communist William L. Patterson and Socialist Labor candidate Olive Johnson.

Election

Mayor Jimmy Walker, who was supported by Tammany Hall, resigned on September 1, 1932, following investigations into corruption by the Hofstadter Committee under the leadership of Samuel Seabury. John P. O'Brien, another candidate backed by Tammany Hall, won in the special election. O'Brien won with a majority of the vote, but underperformed Franklin D. Roosevelt's result in the presidential election by 399,061 votes and Herbert H. Lehman's results in the gubernatorial election by 475,050 votes. O'Brien also received a smaller percentage of the vote than Walker had in the 1929 election while Morris Hillquit had received a record high result for the Socialist Party of America in New York City's mayoral elections.

Joseph V. McKee, who had previously served as acting mayor, received 249,372 write-in votes despite not seeking the office due to a movement by Roy W. Howard and the New York World-Telegram.

Results

References

Special mayoral election
New York City special mayoral election
New York City special mayoral election
Mayoral elections in New York City
New York City special mayoral election